The Hatutu Marquesan warbler (Acrocephalus percernis postremus), also called the Hatutu Polynesian warbler or the long-billed Polynesian warbler, is a subspecies of the northern Marquesan reed warbler.  The subspecies is endemic to the island of Hatutu, and one of the primary breeding species in the Hatutu Nature Reserve.

See also 
 French Polynesia
 Marquesan Nature Reserves
 Marquesas Islands

References 

Hatutu Marquesan warbler
Birds of the Marquesas Islands
Hatutu Marquesan warbler
Hatutu Marquesan warbler
Endemic birds of French Polynesia